Syrian Private University or SPU (SPU) (formerly: Syrian International University for Science and Technology) is a private university located in Syria.

History
The Syrian Private University was established in 2005 by a number of Academics and Business men from Syrian and the Arab region. The university has witnessed continual and dramatic improvement to its curricula, offerings and standing, locally, regionally and internationally.

Campus
The 54-acre (250,000 m2) Syrian Private University campus is on Daraa International Highway and it is away from Damascus 24 km.

The Dental Clinics Complex consists of 2 floors, each containing 3 fully functioning dental clinics and 106 dental units in total. The newly constructed dental units serve with the already available one hundred units within the Faculty of Dentistry.

With a capacity exceeding two hundred dental units, SPU’s Faculty of Dentistry has become the largest among all private universities in Syria.

University Hospital

The Syrian Private University Hospital is a private hospital located within the university campus. The Syrian Private University Hospital is considered a high-level hospital in all respects, with a capacity of 200 beds, equipped with the latest diagnostic and treatment methods, and supervised by a medical advisory staff from the most prestigious international universities, and it is linked to many European universities. 

The hospital aims to provide medical services and comprehensive health care at the highest level for all members of society and to provide Practical and scientific training for students of the Faculty of Human Medicine at the Syrian Private University and for resident doctors who wish to specialize, with the aim of developing their skills and providing them with sufficient scientific experience.

Undergraduate programs

Medicine

SPU Medical School rewards Medical Doctor degree for medical students who successfully complete the medical program. The medical curriculum is 6 years long.

Dentistry
SPU Dental School awards Doctor of Dental Medicine DDM degree. Like most Syrian universities offering DDM degrees, the focus on the undergraduate program is on the practical aspects of the profession

Pharmacy
The pharmacy program is five-year leading to a Bachelor of Science Pharmacy (B.S. in Pharmacy). The school of pharmacy underwent major reform in 2011 with new management and new faculty.
The school of pharmacy has attracted many professors from Damascus University and other universities in the region, countries like Jordan and Egypt in addition to Syrian professors.

Business Administration
The Syrian Private University's School of Business Administration currently offers a 4 year degree program in a variety of specializations including marketing and management. Plans are underway to launch a Master program in 2020.

Petroleum Engineering
College of Petroleum Engineering in the Syrian Private University
SPU College Petroleum rewards Petroleum Engineering degree for Engineering students who successfully complete the Engineering program. The Engineering curriculum is 5 years long, College of Petroleum Engineering based system of credit hours at a rate of 177 credit hours in ten semesters.

Student life

Varsity Sports 
The basketball, football, volleyball, tennis, teams at the Syrian Private University participate in various local, regional tournaments.

Library
The SPU library houses a large collection of books and provide many electronic libraries for its student.

References

 
Universities in Syria
Education in Syria
Educational institutions established in 2005
2005 establishments in Syria